Cai Yanshu (born 15 July 1964) is a Chinese weightlifter. He competed at the 1988 Summer Olympics and the 1992 Summer Olympics.

References

1964 births
Living people
Chinese male weightlifters
Olympic weightlifters of China
Weightlifters at the 1988 Summer Olympics
Weightlifters at the 1992 Summer Olympics
Place of birth missing (living people)
Asian Games medalists in weightlifting
Weightlifters at the 1986 Asian Games
Asian Games gold medalists for China
Medalists at the 1986 Asian Games
20th-century Chinese people